Fearnhill School is a mixed secondary school and sixth form located in Letchworth, Hertfordshire, England.

Admissions
Fearnhill School (formerly Letchworth Grammar School) is a foundation comprehensive school located in Letchworth Garden City. There are over 500 students on roll including approximately 70 students in the sixth form. The school is linked as a cooperative trust with The Highfield School as The Letchworth Garden City Education Partnership.

It is situated in the west of Letchworth, just north of the railway line to Baldock and Cambridge. It is on Icknield Way.

History
The school's origins lie in Letchworth Grammar School, which moved to the site in 1976 after the former site closed in July of that year. The building of the former grammar school is on Broadway in Letchworth GC town centre.

Academic standards
After several years in special measures and 'Requires Improvement, in June 2015 the school was judged by Ofsted to be "Good" and affirmed the school’s belief that it can become ‘Outstanding’ by adding that the leadership ‘demonstrate the necessary ambition and vision to secure further improvement for the school’. Ofsted confirmed that ‘teachers are committed to the success of their students’, ‘students behave well around the school’, ‘bullying is rare’ and ‘achievement shows substantial improvement’. In 2019, Ofsted again judged Fearnhill to be in "Requires Improvement". In the GCSE results announced in August 2015, 47% of the students achieved A*-C grades including maths and English GCSEs. The A Level results in August 2022 were the best the school has ever achieved. In 2022, the school returned to a "Good" Ofsted Report.

Sixth form
The sixth form at Fearnhill is thriving and successful and it was noted by Ofsted that ‘sixth form provision is a strength of the school’. Each year the school admits a cohort of students into Year 12, including external pupils from any school according to their GCSE results. The sixth form teaches AS and A2 courses as well as BTEC courses.

House system
The school has a house system with four houses named after key figures in the development of Letchworth Garden City: Gorst, Howard, Pearsall and Neville. Each house is led by a senior member of staff and a sixth form House Captain.
The houses compete against each other to win events such as sports day as well as Christmas and summer house competitions. Students are also awarded house points for good effort, community service and effective learning. The total number of points for each house is used to determine which house is the winner of the annual house competition.
The recent winners of the house competition were: Howard (2013-2014).

Fearnfile
Fearnfile is the Fearnhill fortnightly magazine of news, articles, and original contributions. Fearnfile  is becoming a publication that is written by pupils, for pupils. Previous issues include information about any member of staff who has left or who joined the school that academic year, updates of  music and drama events, sports teams and reports from trips.

Sport
Fearnhill School competes in a range of disciplines across each academic year. Across all year groups students have the opportunity to compete in traditional sports such as football, netball, rugby, hockey, basketball, rounders, cricket and athletics. Aside from these activities Fearnhill also compete in volleyball, table tennis, badminton, indoor athletics and cross-country. Recent successes in the district include: 2015-16 U16 Girls District Badminton Champions; 2015-16 U15 Boys District Football Champions; 2014-15 Senior District Athletics Bronze Medallists; 2014-15 U16 Boys District Football Runners-Up; 2014-15 U15 Boys Basketball District Champions.  
Fearnhill as a long line of athletics success spanning decades. Currently competing against schools from all over Hertfordshire in the county athletics league Fearnhill are yet to mark their stamp on the county stage.

Notable former pupils
 Mandeep Dhillon, TV and film actress
 Ruth Goodman, social historian and TV personality
 Nicky Hunt, double Commonwealth gold medallist for archery 2010
 Dave Kitson, Premier League footballer for Reading and Stoke City
 Victoria Pendleton, Olympic and world champion track cyclist
 Claire Rushbrook, TV actress
 Simon West, film director
 Bryn Davies,  British trade unionist, actuary and politician

Letchworth Grammar School
 Prof William Bonfield CBE, Professor of Medical Materials from 2000-5 at the University of Cambridge, who founded the Journal of Materials Science: Materials in Medicine
 Prof Meir M. Lehman, known for Lehman's laws of software evolution, and Professor of Computing Science from 1972-84 at Imperial College London
 Richard Wiggs, founder of the Anti-Concorde Project

References

External links
 Official site
 EduBase

Secondary schools in Hertfordshire
Letchworth
Buildings and structures in Letchworth
Foundation schools in Hertfordshire